Tutto molto bello is a 2014 Italian comedy film directed by Paolo Ruffini.

Cast
Paolo Ruffini as Giuseppe
Frank Matano as Antonio
Gianluca Fubelli as Eros
Nina Seničar as Eva
Angelo Pintus as Serafino
Chiara Francini as Anna
Paolo Calabresi as Marcello
Chiara Gensini as Katia
Enrica Guidi as Ambra
Ahmed Hefiane as the Emir
Pupo as himself

References

External links

2014 films
2010s Italian-language films
2014 comedy films
Italian comedy films
Films set in Rome
2010s Italian films